The 2012–13 Alabama State Hornets basketball team represented Alabama State University during the 2012–13 NCAA Division I men's basketball season. The Hornets, led by eighth year head coach Lewis Jackson, played their home games at the Dunn–Oliver Acadome and were members of the Southwestern Athletic Conference. They finished the season 10–22, 8–10 in SWAC play to finish in a three way tie for fifth place. They lost in the quarterfinals of the SWAC tournament to Jackson State.

Roster

Schedule

|-
!colspan=9| Exhibition

|-
!colspan=9| Regular season

|-
!colspan=9| 2013 SWAC Basketball tournament

References

Alabama State Hornets basketball seasons
Alabama State
Alabama State Horn
Alabama State Horn